There have been three referendums held in the territory of Gibraltar

 1967 Gibraltar sovereignty referendum
 2002 Gibraltar sovereignty referendum
 2006 Gibraltar constitutional referendum